Judgement is an annual professional wrestling event promoted by DDT Pro-Wrestling (DDT). The event has been held since 1997 as a live event, aired domestically on Fighting TV Samurai since 2002 and later as an internet pay-per-view (iPPV) on CyberFight's streaming service Wrestle Universe. The event is usually held around March and serves as DDT's anniversary event.

Events

References

External links
The official DDT Pro-Wrestling website

 
DDT Pro-Wrestling shows